Rebeka Tīle (born 8 November 1994) is a Latvian footballer who plays as a midfielder and has appeared for the Latvia women's national team.

Career
Tīle has been capped for the Latvia national team, appearing for the team during the 2019 FIFA Women's World Cup qualifying cycle.

References

External links
 
 
 

1994 births
Living people
Latvian women's footballers
Women's association football midfielders
Latvia women's youth international footballers
Latvia women's international footballers